The Joseph Baldwin Academy, or JBA, is a summer program of two three-week sessions for gifted students going into grades 8-10. Founded in 1985, it is intended to provide opportunities for social growth as the students explore college life and take university-level courses. Located in Kirksville, Missouri, the academy is run by Truman State University students, faculty, and alumni.

References

External links
JBA Home

Gifted education
Truman State University